Casino do Lisboa is a casino located at Parque das Nações (Park of the Nations) in the city of Lisbon, Portugal. It was inaugurated and opened to the public on April 19, 2006.

The casino, at the time of opening, had around 700 slot machines (expandable to 1,000), 22 gaming tables, 4 bars, 3 restaurants and a theater seating 600.

Casino Lisboa is owned by Estoril-Sol, a company majority-owned by Hong Kong-Macau gambling king Stanley Ho until his death in 2020, with a minority shareholder with 33%, Amorim. Stanley Ho also owned the same-name Casino Lisboa in Macau, the last Portuguese colony in the country. Amorim is a Portuguese conglomerate, with two other casino concessions in Portugal (Figueira da Foz and Tróia).

The CEO of Estoril-Sol is Mário Assis Ferreira.

Controversies

Location
The casino has been plagued by controversy since it was green-lighted around 2001-2002 by Pedro Santana Lopes, the Lisbon Mayor. The casino was conceived as a way to fund the rebuilding of Parque Mayer, Lisbon's decadent theater district. The fact that it was to be the first casino in the country inside a major urban center (instead of a tourist area) stirred up many negative reactions claiming the casino would create gambling problems, as it would facilitate access of a younger population to games of chance by bringing the games closer to the people.

The projected location within the city itself was publicly changed several times after "definitive" announcements by the Mayor. Withdrawn locations, in succession, were Parque Mayer itself (a project by Frank Gehry that was already underway was suspended), Cais do Sodré, Jardim do Tobacco, and Feira Popular, before finally settling on Parque das Nações.

Concession
All gambling in Portugal is subject to a concession by the State. For that purpose, the country is divided in gaming zones, each having its own concessionary with usually a single casino. The Lisbon Casino falls within the Estoril gaming zone, and as such, was assigned to the concessionary of that zone. However, other gaming concessionaries protested that since it was a new casino, a new gaming zone should be established and an application process for the concession should be opened. Estoril-Sol and the Portuguese Government argued that, despite usually only one casino  by gaming zone being allowed, nothing in the law prevented each zone from having more than one - and, in fact, the Algarve gaming zone set up a precedent, having three casinos.

Location
The casino took up the former Pavilhão do Futuro (Pavilion of the Future), one of the main attractions of the World Expo of '98, which was extensively rebuilt for its new purpose under a project by architect Fernando Jorge Correia. The original architects for the Pavilion (Ana Paula Lopes dos Santos, Miguel Ferreira Guedes de Carvalho and Rui Jorge Garcia Ramos) obtained an injunction to halt construction work on the grounds of copyright violation (due to changes in the façade and in the structure of the building). A superior court overruled the claim, but the construction work was still halted from January to April 2005.

Business

Early figures
The casino was built for 108.9 million euro, including the 15-year concession fee of 30 million euro.

In the first two months of operation, the casino management repeatedly told the press that business was going better than planned. Target number of daily visitors was 6,000 a day; real numbers were 10,000 in the first 30 days and 7,000 until the end of June 2006. Each visitor spent € 90 in gambling. In late June, the casino shifted its opening hours from 3 pm to 3 am to 4 pm to 4 am on weekends (Friday and Saturday). This schedule also applies to eves of holidays.

In the first five months of operation, total revenues reached 30.2 million euro.

Target annual turnover was 70 million euro. 50% of the turnover (intake less prize payouts) reverts to the State as part of the concession terms, but otherwise the company is exempt from the usual income tax laws. In June alone, 14 million euro were awarded in prizes, for around a 90% payout ratio.

Sales on nearby commerce, including the huge Centro Vasco da Gama shopping mall, are reported to have increased overall.

Effects on Estoril Casino
The workers at Estoril Casino, the biggest in Europe, went on strike in January 2005, claiming the opening of the Lisbon Casino, only 35 km away, would reduce the number of clients and threaten their job security. The administration of Estoril-Sol had presented them with a Company Agreement, which said that, if in 36 months, the revenue had gone down due to the Lisbon Casino, they would be able to downsize the workforce. This issue was never fully solved.

The company had announced a projected 20% decline in the revenue of the old casino. That decline was announced to have been just 0,9% in the first month, and 15% after five months.

References 
Casinos completed in 2006
Lisboa
World's fair architecture in Lisbon
2006 establishments in Portugal
Buildings and structures in Lisbon
Tourist attractions in Lisbon

External links 
 Official website
 Architecture office